KMMA-CD, virtual and digital channel 41, was a low-powered, Class A 3ABN Latino-affiliated television station licensed to San Luis Obispo, California, United States. The station was owned by Caballero Television.

History

On May 15, 1996, KMMA-CD signed on as K18FF, and the station was later granted Class A status in 2003.

On September 25, 2006, KMMA-CA switched to the new MTV Tres network (now simply known as Tres since July 2010), which was created as a result of Viacom's acquisition of Mas Musica.

On August 3, 2015, KMMA-CD dropped the MTV Tres affiliation and started broadcasting Spanish religious programming from 3ABN Latino.

On September 30, 2016, KMMA-CD added a digital subchannel with Lifehacks DRTV, which features a near-all paid programming schedule.

On April 13, 2017, the Federal Communications Commission (FCC) announced that KMMA-CD was a successful bidder in the spectrum auction, and would be surrendering its license in exchange for $173,076. Caballero Television surrendered KMMA-CD's license to the FCC for cancellation on July 27, 2017.

References

External links

MMA-CD
Low-power television stations in the United States
Television channels and stations established in 1998
1998 establishments in California
Defunct television stations in the United States
Television channels and stations disestablished in 2017
2017 disestablishments in California
MMA-CD